is a Japanese comedian who is a member of the comedy duo Asakusa Kid.

Suidobashi is represented with Office Kitano.

He is also a manzai comedian, commentator, and a writer in magazine columns and essays.

Filmography

TV series

Current appearances

Former appearances

As a guest

Radio

TV Dramas

Films

Bibliography

Books

Serials

References

External links
 

Japanese male comedians
Japanese radio personalities
Japanese actor-politicians
Members of the House of Councillors (Japan)
1962 births
Living people
Politicians from Okayama Prefecture
Meiji University alumni